The Flxible Metro is a transit bus that was assembled and manufactured by the Flxible Corporation from 1983 until 1995. From 1978 until early-1983, when Flxible was owned by Grumman, the model was known as the Grumman 870, with a Grumman nameplate. The earlier model 870 experienced a large number of major design defects and deficiencies, some of which led to the filing of lawsuits against the company by purchasers, and the successor "Metro" model addressed those defective design issues.

Over the combined 17-year production history, a total of 14,456 were built, of which 4,642 were model 870 and 9,814 were Metros.

History

Under the ownership of Rohr Industries since 1970, while their very popular Flxible New Look was still in production, Rohr began development of what would become the Grumman 870 Advanced Design Bus. The Grumman 870 bus was one of two advanced-design buses (the other being the Rapid Transit Series (RTS II) developed by rival General Motors and later taken by MTS). Both models were compromises by the Urban Mass Transit Administration (UMTA), which sought to develop a "Transbus" design that would be "attractive, roomy, comfortable", and easier for elderly and disabled customers to board, accepting these two models as compromises. At the time, the federal government would subsidize the purchase of only the 870 or the RTS II.

In 1978, Rohr sold Flxible to Grumman for US$55 million, with the sale including the sale of two prototypes of what would become the 870. In spite of the fact that the second prototype failed testing as the result of a cracked "A" frame, and with an endurance test not yet performed, Grumman decided that the 870 was ready for production, and discontinued the Flxible New Look almost as soon as the purchase closed (more in "Litigation resulting" below). The first 870 rolled off the assembly line in spring 1978. Under Grumman ownership, Grumman-Flxible (as the company was called at the time) received a major order of buses from the New York City Transit Authority along with other agencies. The NYC Transit Authority order, built in 1980, is notable because this batch would expose the design flaw in A-frame noted during testing: the inability of the bus to withstand wear and tear in cities where potholes were a problem, forcing all 870s built until that time to be taken out of service beginning that December while repairs to the A-frame were made, which would cost Grumman $7 million to fix. A total of 2,656 buses, including buses in Atlanta, Chicago, Connecticut, Houston, Los Angeles and Orange County, California needed to be fixed.

Eventually, Grumman was forced to sell the line to General Automotive Corporation in 1983 for $41 million, a 25-percent loss after developing the "Flxible Metro" which addressed all of the shortcomings of the Model 870 in 1982.  Under the ownership of General Automotive, the Flxible nameplate was restored to the buses.

Production continued until late 1995, when financial problems prompted the company to suspend production and lay off most of its workforce at the Delaware, Ohio, factory. The layoffs were initially planned to be temporary, but ultimately became permanent, and in 1996 Flxible was forced into Chapter 11 bankruptcy and liquidated. Parent company General Automotive would meet the same fate as Flxible (bankruptcy and liquidation) the following year.

The last Flxible Metros delivered were ones delivered in November 1995 to Monterey-Salinas Transit (Monterey, California), and the Baltimore Metropolitan Transit Authority (Baltimore, Maryland). However, neither of these orders included the Metro with the highest serial number (106591), which had been delivered the previous month to Columbus, Ohio. The official production total for the Metro model from company records is 9,820, but there is strong evidence indicating that the last six of the 25-bus order for Baltimore were never built, and this makes the total more likely to be 9,814 units.

In 1995, some used 870s were purchased from the Central Ohio Transit Authority (Columbus, Ohio) by Kirov, Russia, where they were used until 2004.

Litigation resulting

The Grumman era of production would result in a number of lawsuits related to defects in the A-frame of the 870, involving either Flxible's former owner Rohr or the Metropolitan Transportation Authority of New York.
The Metropolitan Transportation Authority (MTA), in whose buses where the first cracked A-frame problem was noticed in early December 1980 at their Ulmer Park Depot, yanked its NYC Transit Authority fleet for the first time in 1980 (a separate batch for MSBA was built with the problem rectified the next year) and sued Grumman. This lawsuit would result in a settlement to fix all 870 buses built until that time (2,656 examples in all), along with an early termination of the build contract where the final 200 buses of the order were transferred to General Motors.
In 1983, shortly before Grumman sold Flxible, Grumman would sue Rohr Industries for $500 million in federal court, claiming that it was not aware of design flaws in the 870 model before it began production shortly after the sale closed. Rohr was quickly granted summary judgment, which was upheld on appeal; the court noted that Grumman indeed had access to all of the testing information, including knowledge that testing was incomplete.
In 1984, following a fire in a Model 870 NYCTA bus number 411, David L. Gunn, on only his fifth day on the job with the MTA, ordered the Grumman 870 fleet within New York City off the road for the final time (the units for MSBA built in 1981, owned by Nassau County (NY), as well as the units built for the five private companies in the Borough of Queens, New York remained in service until the mid-1990s). That May, the MTA sued Grumman again (which by this time no longer owned the line), asking for $184 million in damages as the result in fraud and $140 million to purchase replacements, referring to the buses as "lemons". This time, Grumman would countersue the MTA for $1 billion, claiming that poor maintenance was the cause, and took out full-page advertisements in local media attesting to this fact. The MTA would end up paying $56 million back to the Urban Mass Transit Administration for refusing to run the buses. The buses would sit for nearly two years at the Brooklyn Army Terminal until late 1985, when UMTA exchanged the payment for equity in MTA properties, allowing for 835 of the 851 buses to be sold. 620 of the buses were rebuilt and sold to New Jersey Transit, 175 of these buses were also rebuilt and sold to the Queen City Metro of Cincinnati, Ohio, with the remaining 40 buses rebuilt and sold to a transit agency in Puerto Rico. The 16 unsold buses were held for evidence until the lawsuit was resolved; one bus (236) was preserved, 13 were sold to the Pioneer Valley Transportation Authority of Springfield, Massachusetts in early 1985, and the remaining two were scrapped.

Model history
The model history of the Grumman 870/Flxible Metro is as follows:

See also

 Rapid Transit Series—competing Advanced Design Bus
 List of buses

References

Further reading 
 Ebert, Robert R. (2001). Flxible: A History of the Bus and the Company. Yellow Springs, OH: Antique Power, Inc. .
 Luke, William A. & Metler, Linda L. (2005). City Transit Buses of the 20th Century. Hudson, WI: Iconografix. .
 McKane, John (2001). Flxible Transit Buses: 1953–1995 Photo Archive. Hudson, WI: Iconografix. .

External links

 Flxible Production List
 Flxible Owners International

Buses
Buses of the United States
Vehicles introduced in 1978
Grumman vehicles